This is a list of games designed for the HTC Vive platform.

List

See also 

List of Oculus Rift games
List of Oculus Quest games
List of PlayStation VR games

References 

HTC Vive
 
HTC Vive